Events from the year 1985 in Scotland.

Incumbents 

 Secretary of State for Scotland and Keeper of the Great Seal – George Younger

Law officers 
 Lord Advocate – Lord Cameron of Lochbroom
 Solicitor General for Scotland – Peter Fraser

Judiciary 
 Lord President of the Court of Session and Lord Justice General – Lord Emslie
 Lord Justice Clerk – Lord Wheatley, then Lord Ross
 Chairman of the Scottish Land Court – Lord Elliott

Events 
 1 June – Scottish Bus Group reorganised into new regional companies.
 6 September – the Scottish Exhibition and Conference Centre opens in Glasgow. 
 10 September – Scotland national football team manager Jock Stein, 62, collapses and dies from a heart attack at the end of his team's 1–1 draw with Wales at Ninian Park, Cardiff, which secures Scotland's place in the World Cup qualification playoff.
 20 November – the Scotland national football team, managed on an interim basis by Aberdeen boss Alex Ferguson, beats Australia 2–0 in the World Cup qualifying play-off first leg at Hampden Park with goals from Davie Cooper (who scored in the game against Wales two months ago) and the debutant Frank McAvennie.
 Mossmorran NGL (natural gas liquids) fractionation plant at Cowdenbeath opens.

Births 
 16 January – Amy Manson, television actress
 10 February – Cath Rae, field hockey goalkeeper
 2 April – Thom Evans, Zimbabwean-Scottish rugby player
 6 June – Drew McIntyre, pro wrestler
 23 November – Scott Brash, showjumper

Deaths 
 27 January – Robert McLellan, playwright (born 1907)
 29 January – Chic Murray, comedian (born 1919)
 7 April – Willie McRae, Scottish National Party politician and lawyer (born 1923)
 2 July – Hector Nicol, entertainer (born 1920)
 10 September – Jock Stein, football player and manager (born 1922)
 7 November – Alexander Thom, aerodynamicist and archaeoastronomer (born 1894)
 24 December – Erich Schaedler, football player, by suicide (born 1949)

The arts
 10 May – first performance of Peter Maxwell Davies' orchestral piece An Orkney Wedding, with Sunrise.
 11 August – a memorial to Hugh MacDiarmid is unveiled near his home at Langholm.
 The Scots Language Society publishes a set of consensus guidelines for spelling Modern Scots, Recommendations for Writers in Scots.
 Deacon Blue form in Glasgow.

See also 
 1985 in Northern Ireland

References 

 
Scotland
Years of the 20th century in Scotland
1980s in Scotland